James Michael Hyde Villiers (29 September 1933 – 18 January 1998) was an English character actor. He was particularly known for his plummy voice and ripe articulation.

He was a great-grandson of the 4th Earl of Clarendon.

Early life
Villiers was born on 29 September 1933 in London, the son of Eric Hyde Villiers and Joan Ankaret Talbot; he was educated at Wellington College, Berkshire and the Royal Academy of Dramatic Art, graduating in 1953. 'Gentleman Jim' Villiers (pronounced Villers) was from an upper-class background, the grandson of Sir Francis Hyde Villiers and great grandson of George Villiers, 4th Earl of Clarendon; his mother was descended from Earl Talbot. His aristocratic ancestry was often reflected in casting, he performed roles such as King Charles II in the BBC series The First Churchills (1969), the Earl of Warwick in Saint Joan (1974), and on stage as Lord Thurlow in The Madness of George III.

Through his father, Villiers was a relative of Thomas Hyde Villiers, Charles Pelham Villiers, Henry Montagu Villiers and the former Secretary of State for Northern Ireland Theresa Villiers. Through his mother, he was distantly related to Charles Chetwynd-Talbot, 22nd Earl of Shrewsbury.

Career
Villiers made his film début in 1958 and appeared in many British productions, including Joseph Losey's The Damned (also known as These Are the Damned), shot in 1961 but not released until 1963; Seth Holt's The Nanny (1965), Joseph Andrews (1977), For Your Eyes Only (1981), The Scarlet Pimpernel (1982), Mountains of the Moon (1990) and The Tichborne Claimant (1998), along with numerous other projects. He often specialised in portraying cold, somewhat effete villains.

He portrayed the role of Colonel Hensman in the television adaptation of Brendon Chase and was heard on BBC Radio 4 as the voice of Roderick Spode in The Code of the Woosters and several other adaptations of the Jeeves stories of P. G. Wodehouse, which starred Michael Hordern and Richard Briers. In the 1978 television adaption of The Famous Five, Villiers featured strongly in the two-part pilot in which he played the antagonist, a rogue bureaucrat known only as Johnson.

Personal life
Nicholas Whittaker, author of Platform Souls and Blue Period, worked in the Belsize Tavern in 1979 and 1980 and claims to recall Villiers' visits to the pub in the company of local actor Ronald Fraser. After closing time, the pair would often be found in the beer and curry restaurant opposite. Rupert Everett also claims to have encountered him in an Indian restaurant, some time in 1985, "leglessly drunk, booming orders and insults to the poor long-suffering waiter in a strange breathy vibrato that was pitched for the upper circle". Elsewhere, Villiers is described as a "big drinker" who entered into drinking competitions with his friend Peter O'Toole.

Villiers was married twice: in 1966 to Patricia Donovan (marriage dissolved 1984), and in 1994 to Lucy Jex; his second marriage lasted until his death. He and his first wife adopted a son, Alan Michael Hyde Villiers (born Alan Donovan).

Death
Villiers died on 18 January 1998 in Arundel, Sussex, of cancer.

Selected filmography

 Carry On Sergeant (1958) as Seventh Recruit
  Edgar Wallace Mysteries -(The Clue of the New Pin) (1961) as Tab Holland
 Bomb in the High Street (1961) as Stevens
 Petticoat Pirates (1961) as English Lieutenant
 Operation Snatch (1962) as Lt. Keen
 Eva (1962) as Alan McCormick – a screenwriter
 The Damned (1963) as Captain Gregory
 Murder at the Gallop (1963) as Michael Shane
 Girl in the Headlines (1963) as David Dane
 Father Came Too! (1963) as Benzil Bulstrode
 Nothing But the Best (1964) as Hugh
 King & Country (1964) as Captain Midgely
 Repulsion (1965) as John
 Those Magnificent Men in Their Flying Machines (1965) as Yamamoto (voice, uncredited)
 The Alphabet Murders (1965) as Franklin
 You Must Be Joking! (1965) as Bill Simpson
 The Nanny (1965) as Bill Fane
 The Wrong Box (1965) as Sydney Whitcombe Sykes
 Sword of Honour BBC TV (1967) as Ian Kibannock
 Half a Sixpence (1967) as Hubert

 The Touchables (1968) as Twyning
 Some Girls Do (1969) as Carl Petersen
 Otley (1969) as Hendrickson
 A Nice Girl Like Me (1969) as Freddie
 Blood from the Mummy's Tomb (1971) as Corbeck
 The Ruling Class (1972) as Dinsdale Gurney
 Asylum (1972) as George (segment: "Lucy Comes to Stay")
 Follow Me! (1972) as Dinner Guest (uncredited)
 The Amazing Mr. Blunden (1972) as Uncle Bertie
 Ghost in the Noonday Sun (1973) as Parsley-Freck
 Seven Nights in Japan (1976) as Fin
 Spectre (1977) as Sir Geoffrey Cyon
 Joseph Andrews (1977) as Mr. Boody
 Saint Jack (1979) as Frogget
 The Music Machine (1979) as Hector Woodville (uncredited)
 For Your Eyes Only (1981) as Bill Tanner
 The Scarlet Pimpernel (1982) as Baron de Batz
 Under the Volcano (1984) as Brit
 Running Out of Luck (1987) 
 Fortunes of War (1987)
 Scandal (1989) as Conservative M.P.
 Mountains of the Moon (1990) as Lord Oliphant
 King Ralph (1991) as Prime Minister Geoffrey Hale
 Let Him Have It (1991) as Cassels
 Uncovered (1994) as Montegrifo
 The Tichborne Claimant (1998) as Uncle Henry

References

External links 
 
 
 Obituary in The Independent

1933 births
1998 deaths
20th-century English male actors
Alumni of RADA
English male film actors
English male stage actors
English male television actors
Male actors from London
People educated at Wellington College, Berkshire
James Villiers